Rex Alan Wright (born in Sydney, New South Wales alongside his twin brother Mark Wright) is an Australian former professional rugby league footballer who played in the 1980s. He played for the North Sydney Bears in the New South Wales Rugby League competition. He also made one appearance at representative level for New South Wales.

Wright is one of only three players ever to have been selected to play for New South Wales in the Rugby League State of Origin series whilst not actually playing in the NSWRL at the time. Wright was playing for North Newcastle in the Newcastle Rugby League when he was selected in 1984 for his sole representative appearance.

After his retirement in 1987, Wright went on to become an assistant coach to Royce Simmons at the Penrith Panthers. He then became the HPE and Sport Coordinator at Masada College and Glenunga International High School.

Career playing statistics

Point scoring summary

Matches played

Sources
 Whiticker, Alan & Hudson, Glen (2006) The Encyclopedia of Rugby League Players, Gavin Allen Publishing, Sydney

References

Australian rugby league coaches
Australian rugby league players
New South Wales Rugby League State of Origin players
North Sydney Bears players
Living people
Rugby league hookers
1959 births